The Karsdorf remains are the bodies of more than 30 Neolithic humans who were buried in the vicinity of  Karsdorf, Sachsen-Anhalt, Germany.

Two males, known as KAR6 (or I0795) and KAR16a (I0797), have been of great interest to scholars as the subject of successful Y-DNA analysis. Both have been found to belong to subclades of Y-DNA Haplogroup R1b, which is rare in modern populations. These ancient specimens' mtDNA haplogroups have been found to be H1* (H1au1b) and H46b. Their autosomal ancestral components also consist of around 70% Western European Hunter-Gatherer (WHG) and 30% Basal Eurasian. Both men lived 7500–6800 BP and belonged to the Linienbandkeramische Kultur ("Linear band pottery culture"; LBK).

Site

Located in the valley of Unstrut, Burgenlandkreis, Saxony-Anhalt, Germany, the Karsdorf sits is characterized by alluvial loess. The place itself was settled intensively since the earliest phase of the Linear Pottery culture (LBK) in the region. The settlement area is at least 50 acres in size and nearly 30 houses have been excavated. So-called ‘settlement burials’ were regularly found in pits in the center of the settlement area, of which individual KAR6/I0795 (feature 170, 5207-5070 calBCE, MAMS 22823) was sampled for this study.

The LBK settlement of Karsdorf (Burgenlandkreis, Saxony-Anhalt) is located approximately 100 km south of Derenburg and Halberstadt, on the river Unstrut, and was occupied between 5240 and 5000 BC (Behnke, 2007). The reasons why this early Neolithic settlement was abandoned are unclear. The Neolithic buildings (n=24) of three settlement stages are dated to the early and middle LBK (after Meier-Arendt 1966). Except for four graves, all of the 30 burials are associated in groups next to houses in the centre of the settlement, similar to the site of Halberstadt. The individuals are buried in house-flanking pit graves at the western side of the houses and mostly arranged in north-east or north-west orientation. Grave goods are sparse; few graves contained more than one pot or a shell or horn pendant. Associated with every house group we can identify a person with outstanding grave inventory, who may represent a founding generation.|Oelze et al.

Burials
A special feature of the LBK site at Karsdorf is graves associated with particular houses, which can therefore be regarded as settlement burials.

Most of the individuals were buried in a flexed position, oriented to the north-east or north-west. Six individuals were inhumed in supine and four in prone position, of which only three showed a fully stretched body.

The LBK in Karsdorf is represented by 24 longhouses oriented north-west–south-east. The assemblage is composed of 20 adults (55% males and 35% females), one juvenile (15–18 years), four as infants of 7–14 years and six infants of 0–6 years.  The maximum age at death of males ranged between 40 and 59 years and of females 40–49 years respectively. The oldest individual is a woman with 65–75 years. In association with the house S and H, women, men, and children were buried together, in some cases even in the same pit. The furnishing of the graves at Karsdorf can be regarded as rather sparse. Only 9 out of 34 burials contained grave goods, such as an axe in a man's grave and a shell buried with a woman, imply sex-specific grave furnishings.

The large variability and the sparse indications for maternal kinship suggest a dynamic and mobile group of which several members were buried elsewhere and/or which integrated individuals who originated from other communities. These integrated individuals could be mostly females due to the high indications for paternal kinship among the analysed individuals.

Isotope analysis
According to Sr isotope ratios, there are two distinct groups of individuals in Karsdorf but none of both are specially 'exotic'. So, there is no indication of individuals who grew up in geologically distinct uplands or further north in central Germany.

The first group, composed of the majority of the males, could have grown up in households that cultivated plots on calcareous soils, very probably in the Unstrut valley in the near vicinity of the settlement. The second group, composed of most of the females, could grew up in households that predominantly cultivated plots on loess, possibly beyond the landmarks of the Unstrut River or about 80m above the site on the Querfurt plateau 1–2 km away. Sex-specific tendencies, the combination of the Sr isotope data with the results of previous carbon and nitrogen isotope analyses, and the similarity of the Sr isotope data of the youngest child with the majority of the males may be evaluated as being in agreement with the predominance of patrilocal residential rules.

The Karsdorf population diet consisted of plant crops consumption quite similar to other LBK sites but ate slightly higher quantities of animal protein. Despite this, there is one female individual that could be classified as a vegan because her results show that she fell in the range of those of the domestic and wild fauna from Karsdorf, indicating she might have lived on the similar herbivore diet for unknown reasons. The consumption of unfermented dairy products is unlikely as there is direct palaeogenetic evidence of lactose intolerance for the site Derenburg. Children in these LBK cultures may have been weaned around the age of three and apparently ate the similar diet as adults after weaning. The highest isotopic value for stable isotopes of nitrogen is found in the youngest Karsdorf individual likely due to breastfeeding effects. In the Karsdorf population the highest animal protein consumption signal is found in a 15–18 years old individual belonging to mtDNA H. In addition, the lowest Plant Crop consumption signal is found in the youngest Karsdorf individual and secondarily in two out of three 21–24 years old individuals belonging to mtDNA U5a and H.

DNA analysis
The two males, KAR6 and KAR 16a, identified as Haplogroup is unknown from Karsdorf constitutes 22.2% of all ancient samples between 7500 and 6800 BP in Germany. The remainder belong to other clades: 22.2% are unknown carriers from Derenburg, and the remaining 55.6% are G2a bearers from Halberstadt and Derenburg.

In 2015 a published study by Mathieson et al. test several individuals from two Neolithic sites in northwest Anatolia, previously found in LBK sites from Germany, was not present in Barcin nor Mentese Neolithic settlements. This fact together with the absence of the mtDNA lineages carried by both individuals from Karsdorf and the occurrence of G2a and the mtDNA lineages carried by all of these G2a individuals, could mean that the Early European Neolithic had a different migration pattern and, therefore, a different geographical origin.

The autosomal data of I0797 showed the lowest frequency of Anatolian Neolithic component and the highest frequency of an unknown ancient human population for any studied LBK individual. This reinforces the hypothesis of a possible different geographical origin for this tribe instead of the Greco-Anatolian origin of other human groups found in the LBK like G2a.

By his side, I0795 showed higher autosomal admixture frequencies of surrounding populations like Hunter Gatherer Europeans I2a (West Hunter Gatherers) and Aegean-Anatolian Neolithics G2a and H2. However, I0795 have the highest frequency of shared DNA with Upper Paleolithic Neanderthals from Central Europe found in any Early Neolithic population. Further comparisons show that I0795 has similar frequencies like Oase-1 when compared with Vindija Neanderthals. When I0795 and I0797 are compared to Oase-1, they both share a very high percentage of DNA 34% and 18% respectively and I0795 12% with Ostuni1. This could mean that this T1a1 tribe from Karsdorf was closest to Upper Paleolithic Hunter-Gatherers than to Mesolithic haplogroups.

Footnotes

Bibliography

Burial monuments and structures
Neolithic Germany
Stone Age sites in Europe
Archaeology of Saxony-Anhalt
Geography of Saxony-Anhalt
Archaeological sites in Germany
Prehistoric sites in Germany
Human remains (archaeological)
Linear Pottery culture